The Nepal women's national volleyball team represents Nepal in international women's volleyball competitions and friendly matches. It is governed by the Nepal Volleyball Association.

Competition history

AVC Central Zone Senior women's volleyball tournament 

  2019 – 
  2021 –

South Asian Games
 1999 –  Bronze medal
 2006 –  Bronze medal
 2010 –  Silver medal
 2016 –  Bronze medal
 2019 –  Silver medal

Current roster 
Roster for the 2019 South Asian Games.

References

National women's volleyball teams
Volleyball
Volleyball in Nepal
Women's volleyball in Nepal
Women's sport in Nepal